Jenkins v. Anderson, 447 U.S. 231 (1980), is a United States Supreme Court case regarding the Fifth Amendment  right against self-incrimination.

Holding
The Supreme Court held that a defendant's silence prior to a Miranda warning can be used by the prosecution to imply an admission. In Doyle v. Ohio, the Court held that silence after a Miranda warning cannot be used against the defendant to imply admission to guilt.

See also
List of United States Supreme Court cases, volume 447
Miranda v. Arizona, 
Summary of case from OYEZ

Further reading

External links
 

United States Supreme Court cases
United States Supreme Court cases of the Burger Court
United States Fifth Amendment self-incrimination case law
1980 in United States case law